Marilyn Louise McReavy (born October 24, 1944) is an American former volleyball player. She played for the United States national team at the 1967 Pan American Games, the 1968 Summer Olympics, and the 1971 Pan American Games. She was born in San Angelo, Texas.

References

1944 births
Living people
Olympic volleyball players of the United States
Volleyball players at the 1968 Summer Olympics
Volleyball players at the 1967 Pan American Games
Volleyball players at the 1971 Pan American Games
Pan American Games gold medalists for the United States
People from San Angelo, Texas
American women's volleyball players
Pan American Games medalists in volleyball
Medalists at the 1967 Pan American Games
21st-century American women